No Time for Comedy is a 1940 American comedy-drama film based on the play of the same name by S. N. Behrman, starring James Stewart, Rosalind Russell, Genevieve Tobin and Charlie Ruggles.

Plot summary
Gaylord Esterbrook (Stewart), a reporter from Redfield, Minnesota (pop. 786, including livestock), writes a play about Park Avenue high society, even though he has never been to New York City. The play is being staged, but needs rewriting, so the producers bring Gaylord to New York. He meets the leading lady, Linda Paige (Russell), who initially mistakes him for an usher. The producer eventually loses faith in the play, but Linda persuades the other actors to continue on a cooperative basis. It becomes a success, and Gaylord and Linda get married. Gaylord proceeds to have four hits in four years, all starring Linda.

After his most recent hit, Gaylord meets Amanda Swift (Tobin) at a party. She feels that his talents are being wasted writing comedies. At her urging, he writes a tragedy about immortality called The Way of the World. The play has no part for Linda. Gaylord eventually decides to divorce Linda and marry Amanda.  Linda then decides to marry Amanda’s husband, Philo (Ruggles).

The Way of the World is a flop, with audiences laughing at unintentionally funny lines, prompting Amanda to drop Gaylord. However, Linda supports Gaylord in his time of need and they reconcile. She gets the idea for a comedy about smug, contemptible, callous stuffed shirts who think that dictators are inevitable and the average man is bloodthirsty and contemptible. Gaylord and Linda decide to start over, and even act out their initial meeting: Gaylord offers to buy Linda cigarettes as if he were an usher.

Cast
 James Stewart as Gaylord Esterbrook
 Rosalind Russell as Linda Page Esterbrook
 Genevieve Tobin as Amanda Swift
 Charlie Ruggles as Philo Swift
 Allyn Joslyn as Morgan Carrell 
 Clarence Kolb as Richard Benson
 Louise Beavers as Clementine
 Robert Greig as Robert
 J. M. Kerrigan as Jim
 Lawrence Grossmith as Frank
 Robert Greig as Robert
 Frank Faylen as Cab Driver

Stage play

S. N. Behrman's play opened on Broadway at the Ethel Barrymore Theatre on April 17, 1939, and ran for 179 performances. The cast included Laurence Olivier as Gaylord Esterbrook and Katharine Cornell as Linda Paige, and was directed by Cornell's husband Guthrie McClintic.

Olivier starred in this play in New York while his lover, Vivien Leigh, was filming Gone With the Wind in Hollywood, causing Leigh stress due to their separation, and according to GWTW lore, influenced her portrayal as Scarlett O'Hara and according to her personal assistant at the time, hurry production so she could be reunited with him.

Radio adaptations

References

External links
 
 
 
 
 1947 Theatre Guild on the Air radio adaptation of original play at Internet Archive

1940 films
1940s romantic comedy-drama films
American films based on plays
American romantic comedy-drama films
Films directed by William Keighley
Films about writers
Warner Bros. films
Films scored by Heinz Roemheld
American black-and-white films
1940 comedy films
1940 drama films
1940s English-language films
1940s American films